Le Roy et fils was a French company making clocks and watches. The company was founded in 1785 by Basile Charles le Roy (1765–1839), who later passed it on to his son, Charles-Louis Le Roy.

Le Roy et Fils became successful and survived the turmoils of the French Revolution. It became clockmaker to Napoleon I, his sister Princess Pauline, Mme Mere and the King of Westphalia. After the restoration of the Bourbon monarchy, it was a warrant holder for the Duke of Bourbon.

A shop was opened in London in 1854 at 296 Regent Street under the name of Le Roy and Son. The name was later changed to Le Roy and Fils. A second shop was opened in London in 1885 at 57 New Bond Street. Le Roy and Fils was a British Royal Warrant holder to  Queen Victoria, and was the only foreign clockmaker that held a British royal warrant.

Modern revival

Under Festina management

Manufacture

References

External links 
 http://www.montres-leroy.com/en/lleroy/history
 https://www.britishmuseum.org/research/search_the_collection_database/term_details.aspx?bioId=83986
 http://www.sothebys.com/en/auctions/ecatalogue/2014/age-elegance-hk0549/lot.58.html 
 http://www.langantiques.com/university/index.php/Le_Roy_et_Fils_Jewelry_Maker's_Mark

British Royal Warrant holders
Watch manufacturing companies of France